Roumelia Lane was the pseudonym of Kay Green (born 31 December 1927), under which she was a British writer of over 35 romance novels for Mills & Boon from 1967 to 1997. Other pseudonyms she used were Florissa May, Guy Granger, Katie Kent, and Harley Davis.

Biography
Green was born on 31 December 1927 in Bradford, Yorkshire, England, UK. On 1 October 1949, she married Gavin Frederick Green, they had a son and a daughter.

Bibliography

As Roumelia Lane

Single novels
Rose of the Desert (1967)
Hideaway Heart (1967)
Summer to Love (1968)
Sea of Zanj (1969)
Terminus Tehran (1969)
The Scented Hills (1970)
Café Mimosa (1971)
In the Shade of the Palms (1972)
Nurse at Noongwalla (1973)
Across the Lagoon (1974)
Stormy Encounter (1974)
Harbour of Deceit (1975)
Where the Moonflower Weaves (1975)
Tenant of San Mateo (1976)
Hideaway Heath (1976)
Bamboo Wedding (1977)
Himalayan Moonlight (1977)
The Brightest Star (1978)
Hidden Rapture (1978)
Second Spring (1980)
Dream Island (1981)
Desert Haven (1981)
Lupin Valley (1982)
Fires of Heaven (1983)
Summer of Conflict (1984)
Night of the Beguine (1985)
Master of Her Fate (1986)
Tempest in the Tropics (1986)
Call of the Cobra (1993)
Nawindi Flyer (1993)
Heartbreak Island (1994)
Stardust (1995)
Danger in Paradise (1997)

Romance Around the World Series Multi-Author
House of the Winds (1968)

Collections
House of Winds / Summer to Love / Sea of Zanj (1979)

Omnibus in collaboration
Sister of the Bride / Scented Hills / Feast of the Candles (1976) (with Iris Danbury and Henrietta Reid)

As Katie Kent

Single novels
Adventures of Hugglemush (1991)

As Guy Granger

Single novels
Tiddly Wink Man (1993)
Diamond Machine (1994)

References and sources

Roumelia Lane at fantasticfiction

1927 births
Possibly living people
English romantic fiction writers